Juan Vicente García Aguirre (born 11 February 1965 in San Sebastián, Basque Country, Spain) is a Basque musician and songwriter. He is best known for being one-half of the Spanish group Amaral with its namesake Eva Amaral.

Aguirre was born in San Sebastián, living there during part of his childhood, then he moved to Zaragoza and founded a band named Días De Vino Y Rosas (Days Of Wine And Roses) there, that released an album in 1991. In 1993, he met Eva Amaral and they formed Amaral, which for the first few years of its existence, mainly played small shows in Zaragoza. In 1997, the duo relocated to Madrid and signed with Virgin-EMI, releasing their first album, the eponymous Amaral in 1998. Since then, Amaral have recorded a total of six studio albums.

References

External links
 Amaral Official Website in Spanish
 Amaral Official Website in English
 Amaral Unofficial Website in Spanish
Días de Vino y Rosas Unofficial Website in Spanish

1965 births
Living people
Rock en Español musicians
Basque musicians
Spanish guitarists
Spanish male guitarists
Spanish folk musicians
People from San Sebastián